Kilgore Independent School District is a public school district based in Kilgore, Texas (USA).

In addition to the city of Kilgore, the district serves rural areas in southern Gregg and northern Rusk counties. The district-wide dropout rate was recorded as 3.2% for 2015-2016.

For 2019, the school district was given a grade of "B" by the Texas Education Agency.

Kilgore athletic teams are known as the Bulldogs.

Schools
Kilgore High School (Grades 9–12)
Kilgore Middle School (Grades 6–8)
Kilgore Intermediate (Grades 4–5)
Chandler Elementary (Grades 1–3)
Kilgore Primary School (Grades PK–1)

References

External links
Kilgore ISD
Ragin' Red Bulldogs Football

School districts in Gregg County, Texas
School districts in Rusk County, Texas